Bogardus is the surname of:

 Abraham Bogardus (1822–1908), American daguerreotypist and photographer
 Adam Bogardus (1834–1913), American trap shooter
 Charles Bogardus (1841–1929), American politician, Union Army colonel, farmer and businessman
 Edgar Bogardus (1927–1958), American poet
 Emory S. Bogardus (1882–1973), American sociologist
 Everardus Bogardus (1607–1647), Dutch Reformed Church clergyman in the New Netherland (North America)
 James Bogardus (1800–1874), American inventor and architect
 Robert Bogardus (1771–1841), American politician and general
 Rose Bogardus, American politician
 Stephen Bogardus (born 1954), American actor